Lane splitting is riding a bicycle or motorcycle between lanes or rows of slow moving or stopped traffic moving in the same direction. It is sometimes called whitelining, or stripe-riding. This allows riders to save time, bypassing traffic congestion, and may also be safer than stopping behind stationary vehicles.

Filtering or filtering forward describes moving through traffic that is stopped, such as at a red traffic light.

In the developing world

In population-dense and traffic-congested urban areas, particularly in the developing world, the space between larger vehicles is filled with a wide variety of different kinds of two-wheeled vehicles, as well as pedestrians, and many other human or animal powered conveyances. In places such as Bangkok, Thailand and in Indonesia, the ability of motorcycles to take advantage of the space between cars has led to the growth of a motorcycle taxi industry. In Indonesia, the motorcycle is the most common type of vehicle.

Unlike typical developed nations that have only a handful of vehicle types on their roads, many types of transport will share the same roads as cars and trucks; this diversity is extreme in Delhi, India, where more than 40 modes of transportation regularly use the roads. In contrast, New York City, for example, has perhaps five modes, and in parts of America a vast majority of traffic is made up of two types of vehicles on the road: cars and trucks.

It has been suggested that highly diverse and adaptive modes of road use are capable of moving very large numbers of people in a given space compared with cars and trucks remaining within the bounds of marked lanes. On roads where modes of transportation are mingled this can cause a reduced efficiency for all modes.

Safety
Filtering forward, in stopped or extremely slow traffic, requires very slow speed and awareness that in a door zone, vehicle doors may unexpectedly open. Also, unexpected vehicle movements such as lane changes may occur with little warning. Buses and tractor-trailers require extreme care, as the cyclist may be nearly invisible to the drivers who may not expect someone to be filtering forward. To avoid a hook collision with a turning vehicle at an intersection after filtering forward to the intersection, cyclists are taught to either take a position directly in front of the stopped lead vehicle, or stay behind the lead vehicle. Cyclists should not stop directly at the passenger side of the lead vehicle, that being a blind spot.

Research
Little safety research in the United States has directly examined the question of lane splitting. The European MAIDS report studied the causes of motorcycle accidents in four countries where it is legal and one where it is not, yet reached no conclusion as to whether it contributed to or prevented accidents. Proponents of lane splitting state that the author of the Hurt Report of 1981, Harry Hurt, implied that lane splitting improves motorcycle safety by reducing rear end crashes. However, in subsequent interviews, Hurt stated that there is no factual evidence to support this claim.

Lane splitting supporters also state that the US DOT FARS database shows that fatalities from rear-end collisions into motorcycles are 30% lower in California than in Florida or Texas, states with similar riding seasons and populations but which do not lane split. No specifics are given about where this conclusion is found in the FARS system. The database is available online to the public. The NHTSA does say, based on the Hurt Report, that lane splitting "slightly reduces" rear-end accidents, and is worthy of further study due to the possible congestion reduction benefits.

Lane splitting is never mentioned anywhere in the Hurt Report, and all of the data was collected in California, so no comparison was made between of lane splitting vs. non-lane splitting. The Hurt Report ends with a list of 55 specific findings, such as "Fuel system leaks and spills are present in 62% of the motorcycle accidents in the post-crash phase. This represents an undue hazard for fire." None of these findings mentions lane splitting, or rear-end collisions. The legislative and law enforcement advice that follows this list does not mention lane splitting or suggest laws be changed with regard to lane splitting.

However lane-splitting riders who were involved in collisions were also more than twice as likely to rear-end another vehicle (38.4 percent versus 15.7 percent).

In Europe, the MAIDS Report was conducted using Organisation for Economic Co-operation and Development (OECD) standards in 1999–2000 and collected data on over 900 motorcycle accidents in five countries, along with non-accident exposure data (control cases) to measure the contribution of different factors to accidents, in the same way as the Hurt Report. Four of the five countries where data was collected allow lane splitting, while one does not, yet none of the conclusions contained in the MAIDS Final Report note any difference in rear-end accidents or accidents during lane splitting. It is notable that the pre-crash motion of the motorcycle or scooter was lane-splitting in only 0.4% of cases, in contrast to the more common accident situations such as "Moving in a straight line, constant speed" 49.1% and "Negotiating a bend, constant speed" 12.1%. The motorcyclist was stopped in traffic prior to 2.8% of the accidents.

Preliminary results from a study in the United Kingdom, conducted by the University of Nottingham for the Department for Transport, show that filtering is responsible for around 5% of motorcycle Killed or Seriously Injured (KSI) accidents. It also found that in these KSI cases the motorist is twice as likely to be at fault as the motorcyclist due to motorists "failing to take into account possible motorcycle riding strategies in heavy traffic".

A very different form of research, where the capacity benefits are examined as well, 1500 powered two-wheelers were video tracked to calibrate an agent based model of movement between and along lanes, also included a Bayesian model calibrated to determine the choices made to move between lanes. This model provides a basis for measuring the risk levels of such choices, and late applications allowed the determination of the capacity gains (in terms of passenger car equivalent) from such movement once filtered to the front of the queue and in continuing non-intersection movements along stretches of road

Belgian policy research company Transport & Mobility Leuven published a study in September 2011 investigating the effects that increased motorcycle usage would have on traffic flow and emissions and found that a 10% modal shift would result in a 40% reduction in commute time and a 6% reduction in total emissions. This calculation assumed that all motorcycles moved between lanes and the space used by them, called a passenger car equivalent (PCE), would be reduced to zero when traffic came to a complete standstill.  It also assumed that motorcycles would overtake cars without hindering them during heavy congestion, and PCE would be between less than 0.5, approaching zero as traffic density increased.

Debate over safety and benefits
Proponents state that the practice relieves congestion by removing commuters from cars and gets them to use the unused roadway space between the cars, and that lane splitting also improves fuel efficiency and motorcyclists' comfort in extreme weather. In the US, transportation engineers have suggested that motorcycles are too few, and will remain too few, to justify any special accommodation or legislative consideration, such as lane splitting. Unless it becomes likely that a very large number of Americans will switch to motorcycles, they will offer no measurable congestion relief, even with lane splitting. Rather, laws and infrastructure should merely incorporate motorcycles into normal traffic with minimal disruption and risk to riders.

Potentially, lane splitting can lead to road rage on the part of drivers, who feel frustrated that the motorcyclists are able to filter through the traffic jam. However, the Hurt Report indicates that, "Deliberate hostile action by a motorist against a motorcycle rider is a rare accident cause." Lane splitting is not recommended for beginning motorcyclists, and riders who do not practice it in their home area are strongly cautioned that it can be risky if they attempt it when traveling to a jurisdiction where it is allowed. Similarly, for drivers new to places where it is done, it can be startling and scary.

Responsibility and liability issues
Another consideration is that lane splitting in the United States, even where legal, can possibly leave the rider legally responsible. According to J.L. Matthews in How to Win Your Personal Injury Claim:

When the 2005 bill to legalize lane splitting in Washington State was defeated, a Washington State Patrol spokesman testified in opposition, saying that, "it would be difficult to set and enforce standards for appropriate speeds and conditions for lane splitting." He also said that officials with the California Highway Patrol told him that they wished they had never begun allowing the practice.  the California Highway Patrol has lane splitting tips on their website. Similar guidelines were posted by the California Department of Motor Vehicles, but those guidelines were subsequently removed.

Safety aspects

California's DMV handbook for motorcycles advises caution regarding lane splitting: "Vehicles and motorcycles each need a full lane to operate safely and riding between rows of stopped or moving vehicles in the same lane can leave you vulnerable. A vehicle could turn suddenly or change lanes, a door could open, or a hand could come out the window." The Oxford Systematics report commissioned by VicRoads, the traffic regulating authority in Victoria, Australia, found that for motorcycles filtering through stationary traffic "[n]o examples have yet been located where such filtering has been the cause of an incident."

In the United Kingdom, Motorcycle Roadcraft, the police riding manual, is explicit about the advantages of filtering but also states that the "...advantages of filtering along or between stopped or slow moving traffic have to be weighed against the disadvantages of increased vulnerability while filtering".

After discussing the pros and cons at great length, motorcycle safety guru David L. Hough ultimately argues that a rider, given the choice to legally lane split, is probably safer doing so, than to remain stationary in a traffic jam. However, Hough has not gone on record as favoring changing the law in jurisdictions where it is not permitted, in contrast to his public education and legislative efforts in favor of rider training courses and helmet use. A literature review of lane-sharing by the Oregon Department of Transportation notes "a potential safety benefit is increased visibility for the motorcyclist. Splitting lanes allows the motorcyclist to see what the traffic is doing ahead and be able to proactively maneuver." However, the review was limited and "Benefits were often cited in motorcyclist advocacy publications and enthusiast articles."

Legal status

Lane splitting is controversial in the United States, and is sometimes an issue in other countries. This debate includes whether or not it is legal, whether or not it should be legal, and whether or not riders should lane split even where it is permitted. A frequently asked question by motorcyclists is "Is lane splitting legal?"

Legal status in Australia

In Australia, a furor erupted when the transport authorities decided to consolidate and clarify the disparate set of laws that collectively made lane splitting illegal. Because of the very opacity of the laws they were attempting to clarify, many Australians had actually believed that lane splitting was legal, and they had been practicing it as long as they had been riding. They interpreted the action as a move to change the law to make lane splitting illegal. Because of the volume of public comment opposed to this, the authorities decided to take no further action and so the situation remained as it was until 1 July 2014 when New South Wales made lane filtering and lane splitting legal under strict conditions. On 1 February 2015, similar relaxations were introduced in Queensland.

Legal status in the Philippines

The Land Transportation Office, through Administrative Order No. 15 series of 2008 prohibits motorcycles from lane splitting along public roads and highways in the Philippines. The order, however, does not include provisions to penalize riders for doing so. Meanwhile, there are no laws prohibiting bicycles or other non-motorized vehicles from lane splitting on roads.

A bill was filed in the 19th Congress by Pangasinan 5th district representative Ramon Guico Jr., who initially filed it in the 18th Congress in September 2019. The bill proposes to ban motorcycles and motorized tricycles from lane splitting except when overtaking, defining it as when a motorcycle or motorized tricycle stops or passes through vehicles during traffic on a broken white line.

Legal status in Taiwan

In Taiwan, no local traffic laws prohibiting lane splitting for motorcycles under 250cc unless they drive outside motorcycle lanes or fail to maintain a safe distance. For motorcycles over 250cc, defined as "large heavy motorcycles" (大型重型機車) and shall apply regulations of small cars by local traffic laws, lane splitting is illegal which can be penalized from NT$3,000 to NT$6,000. However, court decisions allow lane splitting for large heavy motorcycles when lane filtering.

Legal status in the US

The legal confusion in Australia is not exceptional. In a 2012 California survey 53% of non-motorcycle drivers thought lane splitting is legal, although at the time there was no specific traffic law in California that addressed lane splitting. There are other U.S. states in which there are no traffic laws explicitly prohibiting lane splitting, but officials rely on other laws to regularly interpret lane splitting as unlawful. For example, New Mexico does not address lane splitting by name, but has language requiring turn signals be used continuously for at least  before changing lanes, as well as other codes which may be cited by an officer. Many other states have identical codes, derived from the Uniform Vehicle Code.

Lane splitting was legally defined for the first time in California by a bill signed into law in August, 2016. The new law established a definition of lane splitting, while making no mention of whether, or under what circumstances, it is allowed, or not allowed. It also permits, but does not require, the California Highway Patrol, in consultation with government and interest groups, to establish educational guidelines about lane splitting, essentially giving the CHP permission to bring back the FAQ and advice on lane splitting they published, then rescinded after one person complained, in 2009. Sport Rider magazine predicted that "issues are almost certain" due to the law's ambiguity as to what is and is not legal. Cycle World said that while it, "is a step in the right direction, the AB 51 Bill doesn't actually do much to clear anything up." Effective January 1, 2017, section 21658.1 was added to the California Vehicle Code and defines lane splitting, which is now explicitly legal in California. The California Highway Patrol released new lane splitting safety tips as of September 27, 2018.

Bills to legalize lane splitting have been introduced in state legislatures around the United States over the last twenty years but none had been enacted before California.

Utah legalized lane filtering in 2019 and went into effect on May 14, 2019. The Utah Department of Public Safety Highway Safety Office created infographics and videos that demonstrated safe and legal lane filtering.

Montana's governor signed SB9, legalizing lane filtering in March of 2021 and the bill went into effect on October 1, 2021.

Arizona's governor signed SB1273 on March 23rd, 2022  and it will go into effect after 90 days after the end of the second regular session of the 55th Arizona State Legislature. Senator Tyler Pace sponsored the bill and Representative Frank Carroll (Arizona politician) co-sponsored it,  and the bill received support from ABATE of Arizona, a state motorcyclists' rights organization.

See also
Motorcycle lane

Notes

References

Further reading
All available from the United Kingdom Department of Transport websites (executive summary), and the Transportation Research Board Record publication:
WSP Policy and Research UK, Motorcycles and congestion: the effect of modal shift: Phase 3 policy testing. 2004, WSP for Uk Department for Transport: Cambridge UK. p. 44.
WSP Policy and Research UK, Motorcycles and congestion: the effect of modal shift: Phase 2 – Modelling Methodology. 2004, WSP for Uk Department for Transport: Cambridge UK. p. 47.
WSP Policy and Research UK, et al., Motorcycles and congestion: the effect of modal shift: Summary Final Report. 2004, WSP for Uk Department for Transport: Cambridge UK. p. 26.
Burge, P., et al., The modelling of motorcycle ownership and usage: a UK study. Transportation Research Record J Transportation Research Board, 2007(2031): p. 59-68.

External links

Statement on lane splitting from the California Highway Patrol

Cycling
Cycling safety
Motorcycle regulation
Motorcycle safety